The Thuringian goat breed from Thüringen in central Germany is utilized for the production of milk.  It is a variety of the German Improved Fawn goat breed.  The Thuringian goat breed is derived from the selective-breeding of crosses between Toggenburg, Harzerziege, Rhönziege, and Thüringer Landziege goat breeds.  It is well-adapted to mountainous regions but is almost extinct.

See also
 List of goat breeds
 Erzgebirge goat

Sources
Thuringian Goat

Goat breeds
Dairy goat breeds
Goat breeds originating in Germany
Animal breeds on the GEH Red List